Yuan Shaobao cui zhong quanzhuan or Yu Qian quanzhuan, also translated into English as Loyalty of Guard Yu, is a classic Chinese novel in 40 chapters written by Sun Gaoliang around 1580s during the Ming dynasty about the life of Yu Qian.

Citations 

Chinese classic novels
16th-century Chinese novels
Ming dynasty novels